Franz Moritz Wilhelm Marc (8 February 1880 – 4 March 1916) was a German painter and printmaker, one of the key figures of German Expressionism. He was a founding member of Der Blaue Reiter (The Blue Rider), a journal whose name later became synonymous with the circle of artists collaborating in it.

His mature works mostly depict animals, and are known for bright colouration. He was drafted to serve in the German Army at the beginning of World War I, and died two years later at the Battle of Verdun.

In the 1930s, the Nazis named him a degenerate artist as part of their suppression of modern art. However, most of his work survived World War II, securing his legacy. His work is now exhibited in many eminent galleries and museums. When up for auction, his major paintings attract large sums, with a record of £42,654,500 for Die Füchse (The Foxes).

Early life
Franz Marc was born in 1880 in Munich, the then capital of the Kingdom of Bavaria. His father, Wilhelm Marc, was a professional landscape painter; his mother, Sophie, was a homemaker and a devout, socially liberal Calvinist. At the age of 17 Marc wanted to study theology, as his older brother Paul had. Two years later, however, he enrolled in the arts program of Munich University. He was first required to serve in the military for a year, after which, in 1900, he began studies instead at the Academy of Fine Arts, Munich, where his teachers included Gabriel von Hackl and Wilhelm von Diez. In 1903 and 1907, he spent time in France, particularly in Paris, visiting the museums in the city and copying many paintings, a traditional way for artists to study and develop technique. In Paris, Marc frequented artistic circles, meeting numerous artists and the actress Sarah Bernhardt. He discovered a strong affinity for the work of painter Vincent van Gogh. After the 1903 trip, he ceased attending the Academy of Fine Arts. 

During his 20s, Marc was involved in a number of stormy relationships, including an affair lasting for many years with Annette Von Eckhardt, a married antique dealer nine years his senior. He married twice, first to Marie Schnür, then to Maria Franck; both were artists.

Career

In 1906, Marc traveled with his elder brother Paul, a Byzantine expert, to Thessaloniki, Mount Athos, and various other Greek locations. A few years later, in 1910, Marc developed an important friendship with the artist August Macke. In 1910 Marc painted Nude with Cat and Grazing Horses, and showed works in the second exhibition of the Neue Künstlervereinigung (New Artists' Association, of which Marc was briefly a member) at the Thannhauser Galleries in Munich.

Der Blaue Reiter
In 1911, Marc founded the Der Blaue Reiter journal, which became the center of an artist circle, along with Macke, Wassily Kandinsky, and others who had decided to split off from the Neue Künstlervereinigung movement. Though  Marc showed several of his works in the first Der Blaue Reiter exhibition at the Thannhauser Galleries in Munich between December 1911 and January 1912, as it was the apex of the German expressionist movement, the exhibit also showed in Berlin, Cologne, Hagen, and Frankfurt. In 1912, Marc met Robert Delaunay, whose use of color and the futurist method was a major influence on Marc's work; fascinated by futurism and cubism, Marc created art that increasingly was stark in nature, painting natural abstract forms which found spiritual value in color. He painted The Tiger and Red Deer in 1912 and The Tower of Blue Horses, The Foxes, and Fate of the Animals in 1913.

Wartime

With the outbreak of World War I in 1914, Marc was drafted into the Imperial German Army as a cavalryman. By February 1916, as shown in a letter to his wife, he had gravitated to military camouflage. His technique for hiding artillery from aerial observation was to paint canvas covers in broadly pointillist style.

After mobilization of the German Army, the government identified notable artists to be withdrawn from combat for their own safety. Marc was on the list but was struck in the head and killed instantly by a shell splinter during the Battle of Verdun in 1916 before orders for reassignment could reach him.

Style

Marc made some sixty prints in woodcut and lithography. Most of his mature work portrays animals, usually in natural settings. His work is characterized by bright primary color, an almost cubist portrayal of animals, stark simplicity and a profound sense of emotion. Even in his own time, his work attracted notice in influential circles. Marc gave an emotional meaning or purpose to the colors he used in his work: blue was used to portray masculinity and spirituality, yellow represented feminine joy, and red encased the sound of violence.

One of Marc's best-known paintings is Tierschicksale (Animal Destinies or Fate of the Animals), which hangs in the Kunstmuseum Basel. Marc had completed the work in 1913, when "the tension of impending cataclysm had pervaded society", as one art historian noted. On the rear of the canvas, Marc wrote, "Und Alles Sein ist flammend Leid" ("And all being is flaming agony"). Serving in World War I, Marc wrote to his wife about the painting, "[it] is like a premonition of this warhorrible and shattering. I can hardly conceive that I painted it."

Nazi Germany and the seizure of so-called "degenerate" art 
After the National Socialists took power, they suppressed modern art; in 1936 and 1937, the Nazis condemned the late Marc as an entarteter Künstler (degenerate artist) and ordered approximately 130 of his works removed from exhibition in German museums. The Blue Horses was auctioned off at the infamous Theodor Fischer gallery "degenerate art" sale in Lucerne, on 29 June 1939, and acquired by the Musée des Beaux-Arts in Liège. His painting Landscape With Horses was discovered in 2012 along with more than a thousand other paintings, in the Munich apartment of Cornelius Gurlitt whose father, Hildebrand Gurlitt, was one of Hitler's four official art dealers of Modernist art the Nazis called "degenerate" which the Nazis sold or traded to raise cash for the Third Reich.

In 2017, the family of Kurt Grawi demanded the restitution of Marc's painting The Foxes (1913) from Düsseldorf's Kunstpalast. Grawi, a German Jewish banker who had owned the painting before the Nazis rose to power was arrested on Kristallnacht and incarcerated in Sachsenhausen concentration camp in 1938, before he managed to flee to Chile in 1939. The painting passed through Galerie Nierendorf, and William and Charlotte Dieterle, according to the German Lost Art Foundation. In 2021, the German Advisory Commission recommended that the city of Düsseldorf restitute the painting to Grawi's heirs; this was done, and the painting was sold at Christie's by Grawi's heirs in 2022.

Legacy and honors

Marc's family house in Munich is marked with a historical plaque. The Franz Marc Museum which is located in Kochel am See, opened in 1986 and is dedicated to the artist's life and work. It houses many of his paintings, and also works by other contemporary artists.

In October 1998, several of Marc's paintings garnered record prices at Christie's art auction house in London, including Rote Rehe I (Red Deer I), which sold for $3.3 million. In October 1999, his Der Wasserfall (The Waterfall) was sold by Sotheby's in London for $5.06 million. This price set a record for Franz Marc's work and for twentieth-century German painting. In 2008, the former record was again broken when Marc's Weidende Pferde III (Grazing Horses III) was sold for £12,340,500  ($24,376,190) at Sotheby's. This record was again beaten by the £42.6m sale of The Foxes in 2022.

Public collections
Among the public collections holding works by Franz Marc are    :
 Museum de Fundatie, Zwolle, Netherlands
 Solomon R. Guggenheim Museum, New York
 Franz Marc Museum in Kochel am See
 Lenbachhaus, Munich

Selected images

See also
 The Tower of Blue Horses, 1913, missing since 1945

References

Further reading

External links

 Franz Marc Virtual Gallery
 Gallery of Marc's work
 Links on Marc
 WebMuseum Franz Marc Page
  Franz Marc's Cats in Art
 

 
1880 births
1916 deaths
Artists from Munich
People from the Kingdom of Bavaria
20th-century German painters
20th-century German male artists
20th-century German printmakers
German male painters
German Expressionist painters
Modern painters
Academy of Fine Arts, Munich alumni
Camoufleurs
Military personnel of Bavaria
German military personnel killed in World War I
German Army personnel of World War I